The Glasgow Daily Times was a newspaper based in Glasgow, Kentucky, and covering Barren County. Founded in 1865, the paper published its final edition on June 9, 2020.

Previously published daily except Saturdays, the print schedule was reduced to three days a week (Tuesdays, Thursdays, and Saturdays) in April 2020, eight weeks before it was shut down by owner Community Newspaper Holdings Inc. (CNHI), based in Montgomery, Alabama.

History
The newspaper originated in 1865 as the Glasgow Times weekly newspaper. It became a daily newspaper in 1953 after merging with the Glasgow Evening Journal." In 1957, the name was changed to the Glasgow Daily Times."

CNHI closed the newspaper as a result of lost revenue due to the COVID-19 pandemic, one of many CNHI properties which were closed, merged with sister papers, or reduced in publication frequency. In its last edition, Publisher Bill Hanson announced an intent to continue local news coverage through the existing website. But with the entire staff laid off, how local content would be provided for the site was unclear, and the Times website was eventually set to redirect to the CNHI corporate site.

References

External links 
Daily Times Website
CNHI Website

Glasgow, Kentucky 
Newspapers published in Kentucky
Publications established in 1882